Nemo's Bank (French: La banque Nemo) is a 1934 French comedy film directed by Marguerite Viel and starring Victor Boucher, Mona Goya and René Bergeron. The film is based on a 1931 play of the same name, but also has strong similarities to the Stavisky Affair which took place the year the film was released.

Synopsis
A man rises from the gutter to become a leading banker. His involvement in dishonest financial dealings threaten the collapse of his empire, but he is rescued by the various politicians who have interests in the firm.

Main cast
 Victor Boucher as Gustave Labrèche  
 Mona Goya as Charlotte  
 René Bergeron as Émile Larnoy 
 Charles Fallot as Nemo  
 Henry Bonvallet as Vauquelin  
 Guilhon 
 Fred Marche as Pignolet  
 Georges Pally as Le président 
 Gustave Gallet as Biscotte  
 Alice Tissot as Mme Nemo

References

Bibliography 
 Hayward, Susan. French National Cinema. Routledge, 2006.

External links 
 

1934 comedy films
French comedy films
1934 films
1930s French-language films
Films based on works by Louis Verneuil
French black-and-white films
1930s French films